Rebel Hall is a historic plantation house located at Orange, Orange County, Virginia. It was built in 1848–1849, and is a two-story, three bay, Greek Revival style brick dwelling. It sits on a raised brick basement and has a shallow-pitched, standing-seam metal roof. A rear wing was added about 1900.

It was listed on the National Register of Historic Places in 2002.

References

Plantation houses in Virginia
Houses on the National Register of Historic Places in Virginia
Greek Revival houses in Virginia
Houses completed in 1849
Houses in Orange County, Virginia
National Register of Historic Places in Orange County, Virginia
1849 establishments in Virginia